James Leonard Hodges (April 24, 1790 – March 8, 1846) was a U.S. Representative from Massachusetts.

Born in Taunton, Massachusetts, Hodges attended the common schools.
He studied law.
He was admitted to the bar and practiced.
Bank cashier.
Postmaster of Taunton.
He served as member of the State constitutional convention in 1820.
He served in the senate in 1823 and 1824.

Hodges was elected as an Adams candidate to the Twentieth Congress and reelected as an Anti-Jacksonian to the Twenty-first and Twenty-second Congresses (March 4, 1827 – March 3, 1833).
He declined to be a candidate for renomination.
He died in Taunton, Massachusetts, March 8, 1846.
He was interred in Plain Burying Ground.

References

1790 births
1846 deaths
19th-century American politicians
National Republican Party members of the United States House of Representatives from Massachusetts